= Central State Teachers College =

Central State Teachers College may refer to:

- the former name of Central Michigan University
- the former name of the University of Central Oklahoma (1919–1938)
- the former name of Wisconsin State University–Stevens Point
